Shake a Bone is the fifth album by Son of Dave and was released in 2010. The track "Shake a Bone" was featured on a season 3 episode 11 of "Breaking Bad".

The track "Voodoo Doll" appears at the end of the premiere episode of Preacher, the series by AMC.

Track listing
Rock & Roll Talent Show – 1:46
Shake a Bone – 3:04
She Just Danced All Night – 2:52
Brokedown Lincoln – 3:07
Voodoo Doll – 3:09
Guilty – 3:49
Revolution Town – 3:39
Stiletto – 3:05
You All But Stay – 3:49
Undertaker – 2:27
Ain't Nothin But the Blues – 3:49
The Way We Roll 'Em – 3:42

2010 albums
Son of Dave albums
Albums produced by Steve Albini